The Chester Zoo monorail was an internal transport system at Chester Zoo that operated from 1991 to 2019.

Description

The two halves of the zoo were connected by the system and there was one station in each part, one near the lion enclosure (Jubilee Square station) and one near the monkey building (Tsavo station, formerly known as Monkey Island Station).

Each train on the system could seat 24 passengers between its four cars and a full tour took around fifteen minutes. The layout had a separate depot and control room and carried approximately 2,000 passengers per day.

The upgraded system used pairs of  AC motors for each carriage, with remote monitoring managed over a 5 GHz wireless link.

History

The monorail was built and installed by Computerised People Mover International at a cost of $4 million and then opened by the Duchess of Kent in 1991.

Following the major improvements in 2009, the monorail was re-launched by music producer Pete Waterman during a visit on 23 July 2009, when Waterman drove the first loop of the new system. One week later a power failure occurred, requiring the first eight visitors of the day to be escorted off the monorail using a hydraulic lift.

On 17 May 2012, Queen Elizabeth II and Prince Philip took a tour of Chester Zoo in a specially redecorated monorail set painted in a Union Flag theme for their Diamond Jubilee tour of the north-west of England.

About 2017, Redcroft Management Ltd conducted a "Monorail Future Options Appraisal & Viability Assessment" project to evaluate the commercial and practical viability of extending, replacing or closing the monorail, with options of funding by the North of England Zoological Society.

The zoo also stated that it "no longer fits our vision for a world-class modern zoo". The system closed on 3 September 2019.

List of trains

References

Buildings and structures in Chester
Rail transport in Cheshire
Closed railway lines in England
Monorails in the United Kingdom